Praying Mantis are an English heavy metal band. Although a part of the new wave of British heavy metal scene, they pursued a musical direction more melodic and AOR-sounding than their contemporaries.

Career 
Their formation considerably pre-dated the NWOBHM movement. They were formed in 1973 while at college by the Troy brothers, Tino and Chris, Pete Moore and Chris Hudson. Like several NWOBHM bands they made their first available recording at a small 8- track studio in Penge, SE London. It was then handed to Neal Kay at his Heavy Metal Soundhouse later to be released as the Soundhouse Tapes EP on Ripper records in 1979.

1980 saw their profile considerably raised with support slots for Iron Maiden and Ronnie Montrose's Gamma and "Captured City" was included on the Metal for Muthas compilation. The attention won them a recording contract with Arista Records and they released their highly regarded work Time Tells No Lies in 1981. Management instability undermined their success and Arista decided that they didn't wish to take up the option of a further album. The following year they signed for Jet Records, but two subsequent singles didn't quite hit the mark and the band folded. During the making of Time Tells No Lies Praying Mantis recorded a version of the Russ Ballard penned track "I Surrender", but ran into conflict with Rainbow, who went on to release their own version, and had a Top 10 worldwide hit. Instead, Praying Mantis released "Cheated" which reached No.69 in the UK Singles Chart in January 1981.

The band maintained a strong fan base in Japan, and when the Troys temporarily reformed Praying Mantis for a NWOBHM nostalgia tour in 1990, they were encouraged by the response to resurrect the band full-time. A live album with former Iron Maiden members Dennis Wilcock and Paul Dianno on guitar and vocals respectively, joining the band was released as Live at Last, and a follow-up studio album Predator in Disguise was released the following year, and the band soldiered on into the new century. A compilation album, The Best of Praying Mantis, was released in 2004. Following further line-up changes, a new album, Sanctuary, was released in the spring of 2009 and has gained worldwide media acclaim.

In 2013, the band announced they are to release a new single in October that year. The single is to officially introduce new members, John Cuijpers (vocals) and Hans in't Zandt (drums) to the band's fanbase after playing Colchester, Ipswich (with support from MGR Records band Kaine) and Cambridge Rock Festival with the brand new line-up.
A new album called Legacy was released on 21 August 2015.

Discography 
Studio albums
Time Tells No Lies (Arista, 1981) – UK No. 16
Predator in Disguise (Pony Canyon, 1991)
A Cry for the New World (Pony Canyon, 1993)
To the Power of Ten (Pony Canyon, 1995)
Forever in Time (Pony Canyon, 1998)
Nowhere to Hide (Pony Canyon, 2000)
The Journey Goes On (Pony Canyon, 2003)
Sanctuary (Frontiers, 2009)
Legacy (Frontiers, 2015)
Gravity (Frontiers, 2018)
Katharsis (Frontiers, 2022)

Live albums
Live at Last (Pony Canyon, 1990)
Captured Alive in Tokyo City (Pony Canyon, 1996)
Keep It Alive! (Frontiers, 2019)

Singles
The Soundhouse Tapes Part 2 ("Captured City" / "The Ripper" / "Johnny Cool") 12-inch (Ripper Records, 1979)
"Praying Mantis" / "High Roller" 7-inch (GEM, 1980)
"Cheated" / "Thirty Pieces of Silver" / "Flirting With Suicide" / "Panic in the Streets" 2×7″ (Arista, 1981) - [UK No. 69]
"All Day and All of the Night" / "Beads of Ebony" 7-inch (Arista, 1981)
"Turn the Tables" / "Tell Me the Nightmare's Wrong" / "A Question of Time" 7-inch EP (Jet, 1982)
"Only the Children Cry" / "Whose Life is it Anyway?" / "A Moment in Life" / "Turn the Tables" CD EP (Canyon International, 1993)
Metalmorphosis CD EP (self-released, 2011)

Compilations
The Best of Praying Mantis (Pony Canyon, 2004)

Members

See also 
List of new wave of British heavy metal bands

References

External links 

MusicMight bio
Interview with Chris Troy (2009)
Audio Interview with Praying Mantis from Hard Rock Hell Festival 2011

Musical groups established in 1974
English hard rock musical groups
English heavy metal musical groups
Sibling musical groups
Frontiers Records artists
Arista Records artists
Pony Canyon artists
New Wave of British Heavy Metal musical groups
Musical groups from London